USS Flamingo (AMc-22) was a coastal minesweeper of the United States Navy.

The ship was laid down in 1940 as the fishing dragger Harriet N. Eldridge, acquired by the U.S. Navy on 4 November 1940, and placed in service as Flamingo on 6 June 1941.

Flamingo was in service from 6 June 1941 to 10 December 1945, serving in the 4th Naval District and the Potomac River Naval Command.

She was redesignated and reclassified as the Unclassified Miscellaneous Auxiliary, IX-180 on 17 July 1944. Flamingo was struck from the Naval Vessel Register on 8 January 1946. Fate unknown.

References

External links
 

Minesweepers of the United States Navy
1940 ships
World War II mine warfare vessels of the United States